St Laurence's Church, Gonalston is a Grade II listed parish church in the Church of England in Gonalston.

History

The church dates from the 14th century. It was rebuilt in 1843 by Thomas Chambers Hine.

The church is in a joint parish with:
Holy Cross Church, Epperstone
St Swithun's Church, Woodborough
St Peter & St Paul's Church, Oxton

Memorials

Memorials include:
3 early C14 damaged reclining effigies of the Heriz family, 2 of cross legged Knights and the third of Lady Mathilda in wimpole with head under an ogee arch decorated with crockets and further decorated with stiff leaf and more naturalistic foliage. North aisle

References

Church of England church buildings in Nottinghamshire
Gonalston